The Treaty of Resht was signed between the Russian Empire and Safavid Empire at Rasht on 21 January 1732. According to this treaty Russia waived its claim to any territory south of the Kura River. This included return of the provinces of Gilan, Mazandaran, and Astarabad, conquered by Peter I in the early 1720s. The Iranian cities of Derbent, Tarki, Ganja, etc. north of the Kura river would be returned three years later. In return, the Persians, now de facto ruled by the militarily successful Nader Shah granted trade privileges to the Russian merchants and promised to restore the Georgian king Vakhtang VI, then residing in exile in Russia, on the throne of Kartli as soon as the Ottoman troops could be expelled from that country. The provisions were confirmed by the 1735 Treaty of Ganja, according which treaty all the regions north of the Kura river were returned as well.

See also
 Treaty of Saint Petersburg (1723)

References

Iran–Russia relations
Treaties of the Russian Empire
Treaties of the Safavid dynasty
1732 treaties
18th century in Georgia (country)
History of Gilan
18th century in Azerbaijan
1732 in the Russian Empire
1732 in Iran
1732 in Europe
Iran–Russia treaties